UFC Fight Night: dos Anjos vs. Lee (also known as UFC Fight Night 152 or UFC on ESPN+ 10) was a mixed martial arts event produced by the Ultimate Fighting Championship that was held on May 18, 2019 at Blue Cross Arena in Rochester, New York.

Background
The event marked the promotion's first visit to Rochester, New York.

A welterweight bout between former UFC Lightweight Champion Rafael dos Anjos and former interim lightweight title challenger Kevin Lee served as the event headliner.

Elizeu Zaleski dos Santos was briefly linked to a welterweight matchup with Neil Magny at the event. However on March 28, dos Santos announced that he had not been contacted by the UFC about the match. Magny was instead scheduled to face Vicente Luque. In turn, Magny pulled out of the bout on May 13 due to testing positive for Di-Hydroxy-LGD-4033. He was replaced by promotional newcomer Derrick Krantz.

Results

Bonus awards
The following fighters received $50,000 bonuses:
Fight of the Night: Aspen Ladd vs. Sijara Eubanks
Performance of the Night: Michel Pereira and Grant Dawson

See also 

 List of UFC events
 2019 in UFC
 List of current UFC fighters
 Mixed martial arts in New York

References 

UFC Fight Night
2019 in mixed martial arts
Mixed martial arts in New York (state)
Sports in Rochester, New York
May 2019 sports events in the United States
2019 in sports in New York (state)